Villines may refer to:

Matt Villines (1977-2016), American filmmaker
Michael Villines (born 1967), American politician
Villines Mill, mill in Arkansas, United States